Thomandersia laurifolia is a small tree or shrub native to Central Africa.  Some residents where the tree grows use the leaves of the plant for antiparasitic properties and to relieve fevers. The western lowland gorilla (Gorilla gorilla gorilla) is known to eat the leaves of the plant, possibly also for pharmaceutical purposes, as the leaves are bitter.

References

Lamiales
Flora of West Tropical Africa
Flora of West-Central Tropical Africa
Taxa named by Henri Ernest Baillon
Taxa named by Thomas Anderson (botanist)